Hendrik van Oort (6 August 1775 in Utrecht – 17 February 1847 in Utrecht) was a 19th-century painter from the Northern Netherlands. Among his best known works are In the Meadow and The Shoemaker, the latter of which is on display at the Northampton Museum and Art Gallery, painted some time between 1800 and 1830.

Mainly a landscape painter, van Oort chose mainly quaint rural villages, small towns and rural folk as his subjects. But he also captured landscapes of cities such as Amsterdam; his landscape View of Canal, Amsterdam sold at the Amsterdam branch of Christie's on September 5, 2000, for $3,353.  A View Of The Sint Jan's Kerkhof was painted at Utrecht in 1824. Henrik's son, Pieter van Oort, was also a noted landscape artist and architect. Besides his son he taught the painter David van der Kellen Jr., who became a respected medallist and engraver.

References

External links

Hendrik van Oort on Artnet

1775 births
1847 deaths
19th-century Dutch painters
Dutch male painters
Artists from Utrecht
19th-century Dutch male artists